Daniel Simões, known professionally as Daniel Gracie, is a Brazilian former mixed martial artist, professional wrestler and practitioner of Brazilian Jiu-Jitsu. He is cousin to Renzo Gracie, Ralph Gracie, Charles Gracie and Ryan Gracie.

Biography
Daniel “Gracie” Simoes was born June 28, 1972 in Rio de Janeiro, Brazil. Being very close to his cousins; Charles, Renzo, Ralph and Ryan Gracie, jiu-jitsu was always present in Daniel's life growing up. He started taking training more serious around 1982, training under Carlos Gracie, Jr. at Gracie Barra. He received his black belt in 1996 after winning at the World Jiu-Jitsu Championship in the absolute division as a brown belt.

Mixed martial arts
Gracie has competed both in sport BJJ and mixed martial arts events such as the PRIDE Fighting Championships, the International Fight League, and the prestigious ADCC Submission Wrestling World Championship. He fought for Team Gracie in the IFL, where he submitted former UFC fighter Wes Sims. After a TKO loss in 2006, Daniel decided to walk away from MMA for a while to concentrate on teaching BJJ at Renzo Gracie's Academy.

Return
Gracie made his return to MMA after a 4-year hiatus from fighting. He fought at Israel FC: Genesis and earned a quick 1st round submission victory.

Bellator Fighting Championships
Gracie participated in the Bellator Season 4 light heavyweight tournament that began in March 2011 on MTV2.  He was eliminated in the opening round at Bellator 38 by Tim Carpenter via split decision.

Professional wrestling
On October 14, 2013, Daniel, along with Rolles Gracie, Jr., made an appearance for professional wrestling promotion New Japan Pro-Wrestling (NJPW) at the King of Pro-Wrestling pay-per-view, issuing an open challenge for the January 4, 2014, Wrestle Kingdom 8 in Tokyo Dome event, which was later answered by Yuji Nagata and Kazushi Sakuraba, the latter known as the "Gracie Hunter" for his MMA bouts with members of the Gracie family. The Gracies lost the match via disqualification, after Rolles choked Nagata out with his gi. A rematch between the two teams took place on February 11 at The New Beginning in Osaka and saw Rolles submit Sakuraba for the win. On April 6 at Invasion Attack 2014, the Gracies defeated Takashi Iizuka and Toru Yano in another tag team match. Later in the event, Daniel entered the IWGP Intercontinental Championship picture by challenging Shinsuke Nakamura, whom he had defeated in an MMA fight in 2002. The Gracies' win streak continued on May 3 at Wrestling Dontaku 2014, where they defeated Nakamura and Sakuraba. This led to Daniel's first singles match on May 25 at Back to the Yokohama Arena, where he unsuccessfully challenged Nakamura for the IWGP Intercontinental Championship.

Personal life
Contrary to popular belief, Daniel is not a Gracie by name but he is blood related. Daniel is the cousin of brothers: Charles, Renzo, Ralph and Ryan Gracie. Daniel's mother is a Renzo’s mother’s sister. Having been raised amongst the Gracie family, Daniel earned the legitimate right to adopt the Gracie surname as his own professionally.

Mixed martial arts record

|-
| Loss
|align=center| 5–4–1
| Duane Bastress
| TKO (doctor stoppage)
| Bellator 54
| 
|align=center| 2
|align=center| 5:00
| Atlantic City, New Jersey, United States
|
|-
| Loss
|align=center| 5–3–1
| Tim Carpenter
| Decision (split)
| Bellator 38
| 
|align=center| 3
|align=center| 5:00
| Tunica, Mississippi, United States
| 
|-
| Win
|align=center| 5–2–1
| Martin Wojcik
| Submission (rear-naked choke)
| Israel FC: Genesis
| 
|align=center| 1
|align=center| 2:17
| Tel Aviv, Israel
| 
|-
| Loss
|align=center| 4–2–1
| Allan Goes
| TKO (punches)
| IFL: World Championship Semifinals
| 
|align=center| 2
|align=center| 1:03
| Portland, Oregon, United States
| 
|-
| Win
|align=center| 4–1–1
| Wes Sims
| Technical Submission (standing rear-naked choke)
| IFL: Championship 2006
| 
|align=center| 1
|align=center| 2:42
| Atlantic City, New Jersey, United States
| 
|-
| Draw
|align=center| 3–1–1
| Wes Sims
| Technical Draw
| GFC: Team Gracie vs Team Hammer House
| 
|align=center| 2
|align=center| 5:00
| Columbus, Ohio, United States
| 
|-
| Win
|align=center| 3–1
| Wataru Sakata
| Submission (armbar)
| Pride: Shockwave 2003
| 
|align=center| 1
|align=center| 7:12
| Saitama, Saitama, Japan
| 
|-
| Loss
|align=center| 2–1
| Kazuhiro Nakamura
| Decision (unanimous)
| Pride Bushido 1
| 
|align=center| 2
|align=center| 5:00
| Saitama, Saitama, Japan
| 
|-
| Win
|align=center| 2–0
| Shinsuke Nakamura
| Submission (armbar)
| Inoki Bom-Ba-Ye 2002
| 
|align=center| 2
|align=center| 2:14
| Saitama, Saitama, Japan
| 
|-
| Win
|align=center| 1–0
| Takashi Sugiura
| Decision (split)
| Pride 21
| 
|align=center| 3
|align=center| 5:00
| Saitama, Saitama, Japan
|

References

External links 
 Daniel Gracie BJJ Heroes Profile
Daniel Gracie's New Japan Pro-Wrestling profile 
 Daniel Gracie's Official Website
 
 List of official Renzo Gracie Academy instructors
 Renzo Gracie's Stamford Academy
 

Living people
Brazilian male mixed martial artists
Heavyweight mixed martial artists
Mixed martial artists utilizing Brazilian jiu-jitsu
Sportspeople from Rio de Janeiro (city)
1972 births
Daniel
Brazilian male professional wrestlers
People awarded a black belt in Brazilian jiu-jitsu